Cavuto Live is a two-hour weekend news program focusing on the intersection of business and politics on Fox News. It is hosted by Neil Cavuto and debuted on January 20, 2018. The live show replaces the pre-recorded The Cost of Freedom block of programming that has aired from 10:00 a.m. to 12:00 p.m. ET since 2001.

On replacing the long-running Cost of Freedom block, Cavuto said in a press release "now, with the news often hitting throughout the weekend, we owe it to our viewers to provide real-time reaction on just how these policies and politics impact our lives, and our finances. As I have always said, it’s not about the red or the blue, it’s about the green and I am excited to bring our audience a new, live, two-hour program that delivers the vital news and analysis our viewers need in this ever-changing political and economic landscape."

References

2010s American television news shows
2018 American television series debuts
Business-related television series
Fox News original programming